Northia is a genus of plants in the family Sapotaceae.

The name was first published by  Joseph Dalton Hooker, in  Hooker's Icones Plantarum (Sep 1884), in his description of Northia seychellana. The spelling was given as Northia on the plate, but the variant Northea in the text. Hooker gave the genus name in honour of the botanical illustrator and painter, Marianne North.

Northia seychellana is the only species accepted in the genus. It is endemic to the Seychelles Islands. A few other species were formerly included in Northia but have been moved to Manilkara:

Formerly included
 Northia fasciculata - Manilkara fasciculata - Indonesia, Philippines, New Guinea
 Northia hoshinoi - Manilkara hoshinoi  - Pohnpei
 Northia vitiensis - Manilkara vitiensis - Fiji

References

 
Flora of Seychelles
Taxonomy articles created by Polbot
Taxobox binomials not recognized by IUCN
Taxa named by Joseph Dalton Hooker
Plants described in 1884